35 Corps, 35th Corps, Thirty-fifth Corps, or XXXV Corps may refer to:

 35th Army Corps (France)
 35th Army Corps (Russian Empire)
 XXXV Army Corps (Wehrmacht), a German unit during World War II, part of Army Group Centre
 XXXV Airborne Corps (United States), a diversionary 'phantom' unit of the United States Army

See also
 List of military corps by number
 35th Division (disambiguation)
 35th Regiment (disambiguation)
 35th Squadron (disambiguation)